Hadsten Grand Prix (also known as Det Nye Løb) is a bicycle race held in Hadsten, Denmark. The race has been held annually since 1993 (with cancellations in 2004 and 2009 to 2010).

Winners

External links
 Official website

References

Cycle races in Denmark
Recurring sporting events established in 1993
1993 establishments in Denmark
Summer events in Denmark